Witter is an unincorporated community in Madison County, Arkansas, United States. Witter has a post office with ZIP code 72776.

References

Unincorporated communities in Madison County, Arkansas
Unincorporated communities in Arkansas